Philomena Johanna Maria Essed (Utrecht, 1955) is a professor of Critical Race, Gender and Leadership Studies at Antioch University Yellow Springs, Ohio.

Biography 
Essed's parents are Surinamese. Her father Max Essed was a pediatrician. She grew up in Suriname and the Netherlands. From the age of fifteen she lived in Nijmegen, until moving in 1974 to Amsterdam.

Career 
In 1983 Essed passed her doctoral exams in cultural anthropology at the University of Amsterdam, and received her PhD cum laude in the social sciences in 1990 under the supervision of Chris Mullard.

She worked at the University of Amsterdam from receiving her doctorate until 2003. She was a member of the Dutch Tijdelijke Expertise Commissie Emancipatie in het Nieuwe Adviesstelsel (Temporary Expert Committee on Emancipation in the New Advisory System) from 1998 to 2001, appointed by the Dutch Ministry of Social Affairs and Employment. She served as a deputy member of the Netherlands Institute for Human Rights (College voor de Rechten van de Mens) from 2004 to 2016. Between 2001 and 2005 she was a visiting professor at the University of California, Irvine. In 2005 she became a professor at Antioch University. She has also held visiting positions at Umeå University and the University of Johannesburg, and has served as faculty at the Black Europe Summer School since 2008.

Everyday Racism 

Essed is primarily known for her books Alledaags racisme (1984) and Understanding Everyday Racism: An Interdisciplinary Theory (1990). The latter, following its Dutch translation in 1991 (as Inzicht in alledaags racisme) created a strong reaction in the Dutch public debate.

Recognition 
Essed received honorary doctorates from the University of Pretoria in 2011 and Umeå University in 2015.

In 2011 she was made a knight in the Order of Orange-Nassau.

Published works 

 Alledaags racisme, 1984
 Understanding Everyday Racism: An Interdisciplinary Theory (Inzicht in Alledaags Racisme), dissertation, 1990
 Everyday Racism. Reports From Women of Two Cultures. Hunter House, 1990
 Diversity. Gender, Color and Culture, University of Massachusetts Press, 1996
 Refugees and the Transformation of Societies, with David Theo Goldberg, 2004
 A Companion to Gender Studies, with David Theo Goldberg, 2009
 Clones, Fakes and Posthumans: Cultures of Replication, Rodopi/Brill, 2012
 Dutch Racism, with Isabel Hoving, 2015

References

External links 
 

Antioch University faculty
Dutch anti-racism activists
Knights of the Order of Orange-Nassau
Living people
People from Paramaribo
Gender studies academics
20th-century Dutch women writers
21st-century Dutch women writers
University of Amsterdam alumni
1955 births